Girim of Silla (r. 298–310, died 310), whose name is sometimes given as Girip and also as Gigu, was the fifteenth king of Silla.  The Samguk Sagi records that he was either the grandson or great-grandson of King Jobun.

In 308, he gave the country the name "Silla."  It had previously been known as Saro-guk or Seorabeol.

Family 
Grandmother: Queen Aihye, of the Seok Clan (아이혜부인), daughter of Naehae of Silla
Granddfather: Jobun of Silla
Father: Seok Gul-suk (석걸숙)

See also
Three Kingdoms of Korea
Rulers of Korea
History of Korea

References
 Kim Bu-sik. Samguk Sagi, Part 2.

Silla rulers
310 deaths
4th-century monarchs in Asia
3rd-century monarchs in Asia
Year of birth unknown
3rd-century Korean people
4th-century Korean people